Levy is a restaurant and hospitality company based in Chicago specializing in providing food and beverage to major entertainment and sports venues.  Founded in 1978, with a single family-run delicatessen in Water Tower Place, since 2006, it has been a wholly owned subsidiary of Britain's Compass Group.

It operates over 200 sports and entertainment venues in 41 markets throughout the US and Canada. In 2004, company revenue exceeded $470 million, and by 2017 had exceeded $1.5 billion in revenue. The company also owns and operates several restaurants in addition to its sports and entertainment venue concessions.

History

The company was founded in Chicago, IL in 1978 by Larry Levy of St. Louis.  The first property was D.B. Kaplan's Delicatessen in Chicago's Water Tower Place. In 1982, the company pioneered the concept of fine dining in stadiums and arenas with award-winning restaurants and foodservice locations at Chicago's Comiskey Park (home of the Chicago White Sox) and again in 1985 in Chicago's Wrigley Field (home of the Chicago Cubs.) In 1989, the company was selected by The Walt Disney Company to own and operate two locations inside their world-famous Walt Disney World Resort, Terralina Crafted Italian and Paddlefish. Levy was also a partner in the former Wildhorse Saloon location at Walt Disney World. The Terralina Crafted Italian's has consistently been voted best Italian restaurant in Orlando. Paddlefish has achieved one of the top ten sales volumes of any restaurant in the United States. In 1994 they added their first location outside Chicago. The company also created and implemented the WOCAAT (Winning One Customer At A Time) training philosophy.

Locations

Levy's sports and entertainment division manages convention facilities, concert and performance venues and arenas for all major sports leagues. They currently manage food service operations inside Barclays Center in Brooklyn, NY; Enterprise Center in St. Louis, MO; Xcel Energy Center in St. Paul, MN; Allegiant Stadium and T-Mobile Arena in Las Vegas, NV; Oakland Arena in Oakland, CA; STAPLES Center and Dodger Stadium in Los Angeles; American Airlines Arena in Miami, FL; American Airlines Center in Dallas, TX; Nationals Stadium, Audi Field in Washington, D.C., as well as Fedex Field in Landover MD, Ford Field in Detroit, MI; Wrigley Field, Guaranteed Rate Field, and the United Center in Chicago, IL; Impact Field in Rosemont, IL; The USTA National Tennis Center in Flushing, NY; Chase Field in Phoenix, AZ; Moda Center in Portland, OR; Providence Park in Portland, OR; Bank of America Stadium, Charlotte Motor Speedway and Spectrum Center in Charlotte, NC; Toyota Center in Houston, TX, among many others nationwide.  They also manage all food service operations at the Ravinia Festival in Highland Park, IL  and multiple establishments inside Walt Disney World in Orlando, FL. Levy manages all food service operations for Churchill Downs in Louisville, KY, the home of the Kentucky Derby. Levy also operates at TD Place Arena and TD Place Stadium in Ottawa, Canada, respective homes of the Ottawa 67's and Ottawa Redblacks.

Levy operates the restaurant Maddon's Post as a partnership between Chef Tony Mantuano and former Chicago Cubs manager Joe Maddon.

Restaurants

In addition to its role as the food & beverage provider at sports and entertainment venues, Levy operates several standalone restaurants.

References

Chicago Business: May 18, 2006 Levy Restaurants to operate food services at Sears Centre
Hoover's - Levy Restaurants
St. Louis Business Journal, June 30, 2006 - Koplar, Levy set new table - Destination restaurant to anchor $20 million project in Central West End, by Lisa R. Brown
Pittsburgh Business Times. January 17, 2006, Levy Restaurants selling to British firm

External links
Levy Restaurants Official site
Compass Group - Levy Restaurants
Spiaggia, Cafe Spiaggia and Private Dining Rooms of Spiaggia  Official site
River Roast

Food and drink companies based in Chicago
Restaurants established in 1978
Catering and food service companies of the United States
Compass Group